.mr is the Internet country code top-level domain (ccTLD) for Mauritania.

.mr domains can be registered by Mauritanian citizens, residents, and legal entities with a local representation.

History
The management of the Internet Top-Level-Domain Names in Mauritania was delegated by ICANN to the Faculty of Science and Technology (FST) of the University of Nouakchott in April 1996. As the country was not connected to the internet at that time, IRD (Montpellier, France) hosted the .mr name servers.

Once the required infrastructure is established by April 2000, Network Information Center was created within the Faculty of Science and Technology and started hosting the .mr name servers.

Structure
Registrations are taken directly at the second level, under .mr. However, a number of second level domains exists for different purposes.

Internationalized domain name
On 27 January 2019, ICANN approved a request for delegation of the  internationalised country-code top-level domain representing Mauritania in Arabic script to Université de Nouakchott Al Aasriya. As of December 2022, no information regarding the registration under this TLD is available on the registry website.

References

External links 
 IANA .mr whois information
 .mr domain registration website
 domain application form

Country code top-level domains
Communications in Mauritania

sv:Toppdomän#M